Britz is a railway station in the town of Britz, Brandenburg, Germany. The station lies of the Berlin–Szczecin railway and the train services are operated by Deutsche Bahn and Niederbarnimer Eisenbahn.

Train services
The station is served by the following services:

Regional services  Stralsund - Greifswald - Pasewalk - Angermünde - Berlin - Ludwigsfelde - Jüterbog - Falkenberg - Elsterwerda
Regional services  Schwedt - Angermünde - Berlin - Ludwigsfelde - Jüterbog - Lutherstadt Wittenberg
Local services  Eberswalde - Joachimsthal

References

Railway stations in Brandenburg
Buildings and structures in Barnim
Railway stations in Germany opened in 1875